Imran Nazar Hosein (born 1942) is a Trinidadian and Tobagonian Islamic scholar, author and philosopher, who specializes in Islamic eschatology, world politics, economics, and modern socio-economic/political issues. He is the author of Jerusalem in the Qur'an and other books.

Background and education

Hosein was born into an Indo-Trinidadian family in Trinidad and Tobago. He studied Islam under the guidance of the Islamic scholar, Muhammad Fazlur Rahman Ansari at the Aleemiyah Institute of Islamic Studies, Karachi, Pakistan. He also did post-graduate studies in Philosophy at Karachi University, and International Relations at the University of West Indies, Trinidad, and the Graduate Institute of International Studies, Geneva, Switzerland. He led the Jumu'ah prayers and delivered the sermon at the United Nations headquarters in Manhattan once a month for ten years.

Positions 
Sheikh Hosein opposes fiat currency, describing it as 'bogus, fraudulent, Haram and an amazingly dangerous instrument of oppression and universal slavery' although based on the Islamic principle of necessity he states that 'we are permitted to use it until such time as we can escape from its poisonous, deadly and sinful embrace'. He proposes that fiat currency be removed 'through the creation of micro-markets which use only Sunnah money and which are a part of remotely-located Muslim Villages.'

Opposition
Ebrahim Desai, who ran the website Askimam, claimed Hosein has deviant positions, such as rejecting certain authentic hadiths and diverting from the consensus opinion. For example, he issued a fatwa, an Islamic legal opinion, discouraging Muslims from listening to his talks. A second fatwa by the same scholar said that due to his views some hadiths of Sahih al-Bukhari are fabricated and Gog and Magog have already been released.

Two other Islamic websites have published articles espousing similar views.

Hosein has been banned from speaking at Mucurapo Mosque.

Literary works

References

External links

1942 births
Living people
20th-century Muslim scholars of Islam
Trinidad and Tobago Muslims
Anti-Zionism in North America
Graduate Institute of International and Development Studies alumni
Trinidad and Tobago expatriates in Pakistan
University of Karachi alumni
University of the West Indies alumni
Al-Azhar University alumni
Islamic religious leaders
Muslim missionaries
Trinidad and Tobago people of Indian descent
Trinidad and Tobago writers